The 2019 Blue Stars/FIFA Youth Cup was the 81st edition of the Blue Stars/FIFA Youth Cup, an association football tournament organized by FIFA for clubs featuring players under the age of 21. It was held on Ascension Thursday, 30 May 2019 and 31 May 2019.

This year's women's tournament was the second edition after the 2018 edition which Young Boys women team won.

All matches were played in two 20-minute halves (except for the final which was 25 minutes), only players between 18–20 years were eligible to participate. However, each team may have up to five players under the age of  18 feature. All matches were played at the Buchlern sports stadium in Zurich.

Men's tournament 

 Participating teams

  FC Blue Stars Zürich
  FC Basel
  SL Benfica
  Boca Juniors
  Dinamo Zagreb
  FC Zürich
  GC Zürich
  PAOK
  Seattle Sounders
  Sevilla

Group stage

Group A 

Times in UTC+, Switzerland local time.

Group B 

Times in UTC+, Switzerland local time.

Final stage 
Times in UTC+1, Switzerland local time.
Ninth place game

Seventh place game

Fifth place game

Third place game

Final

Final standings 

|}

Women's tournament 

Participating teams

  FC Blue Stars Zürich
  Internazionale
  Vancouver Whitecaps
  Wolfsburg
  BSC YB Frauen
  FC Zürich Frauen

Group stage

Group A 

Times in UTC+, Switzerland local time.

Group B 

Times in UTC+1, Switzerland local time.

Final stage 
Times in UTC+1, Switzerland local time.

Semi-finals

Play-off stage 
 Fifth place game

Third place game

Final

Final standings 

|}

References

External links 
 2019 Blue Stars/FIFA Youth Cup, YouthCup.ch 

2019 in association football
2019 in youth association football
International association football competitions hosted by Switzerland
May 2019 sports events in Europe